White House Down is a 2013 American political action thriller film directed by Roland Emmerich and written by James Vanderbilt. In the film, a divorced US Capitol Police officer attempts to rescue both his daughter and the President of the United States when a destructive terrorist assault occurs in the White House. The film stars Channing Tatum, Jamie Foxx, Maggie Gyllenhaal, Joey King, Jason Clarke, Richard Jenkins, and James Woods.

Released on June 28, 2013, by Sony Pictures Releasing, White House Down received mixed reviews from critics toward the screenwriting and the clichéd storyline, although the performances and action sequences were praised. The film grossed over $205 million worldwide at the box office, against a budget of $150 million. White House Down was one of two films released in 2013 that dealt with a terrorist attack on the White House; the other, Olympus Has Fallen, was released three months earlier.

Plot
U.S. President James Sawyer makes a controversial proposal to remove military forces from the Middle East. Divorced veteran John Cale works as a Capitol Police officer assigned to Speaker of the House Eli Raphelson, whose nephew he saved while serving in Afghanistan. Cale hopes to impress his daughter Emily by interviewing for the Secret Service, getting tickets for them to tour the White House. His interviewer, Deputy Special Agent-in-Charge Carol Finnerty, a college acquaintance, deems him unqualified for the job.

Cale and his daughter take a guided tour of the White House. Meanwhile, a mysterious man disguised as a janitor detonates a bomb in the United States Capitol, collapsing the rotunda and sending Washington, D.C. into lockdown. Finnerty escorts Raphelson to an underground command center in the Pentagon, while Vice President Alvin Hammond is taken aboard Air Force Two. At the same time, a paramilitary team of mercenaries led by ex-Delta Force and CIA operative Emil Stenz infiltrate the White House and overwhelm the Secret Service, seizing the building. The tour group is taken hostage in the Blue Room by white nationalist Carl Killick, but Cale escapes to search for Emily, separated during the tour. Retiring Head of the Presidential Detail, Special Agent-in-Charge Martin Walker brings Sawyer to the PEOC beneath the White House Library. Inside, Walker kills Sawyer's detail, including fellow agent Ted Hope, revealing himself as the leader of the attack, apparently seeking vengeance against Sawyer for his Marine son, Kevin Walker, who was killed in a botched mission in Iran the year prior. Cale kills a mercenary, taking his weapon and radio, and rescues Sawyer after overhearing Walker.

Walker brings in ex-NSA analyst Skip Tyler to hack the PEOC's defense system, but requires Sawyer to activate the nuclear football. Killick catches Emily filming the intruders on her phone and takes her hostage. Cale and Sawyer contact the command structure via a scrambled satellite phone in the residence, whereas Finnerty uses Emily's YouTube video to discover the mercenaries' identities. Cale and Sawyer try to escape via a secret tunnel, but find the exit rigged with explosives. They escape in the presidential limo but are chased by Stenz and fall into the White House pool. With Sawyer and Cale presumed dead in an explosion in the cabana, the 25th Amendment is invoked; Hammond is sworn in as president. Cale and Sawyer, still alive, learn Hammond has ordered an aerial incursion to retake the White House, but the mercenaries shoot down the helicopters. Learning Emily's identity from the video, Stenz takes her to Walker in the Oval Office. Hacking into NORAD, Tyler launches a laser-guided missile at the now Air Force One from Piketon, Ohio, killing Hammond and everyone on board. Raphelson is sworn in as president and orders an air strike on the White House.

Sawyer surrenders himself to save Emily. Walker, blaming Iran rather than Sawyer for Kevin's death, demands Sawyer use the football to launch nuclear missiles against various Iranian cities. Sawyer refuses, while Cale sets fire to several rooms as a diversion. Tyler inadvertently triggers the tunnel explosives and is vaporized. Killing most of the mercenaries and freeing the hostages with the help of tour guide Donnie Donaldson, Cale fights against Stenz and blows him up with a grenade belt. Sawyer attacks Walker, but in the fight Walker uses Sawyer's handprint to activate the football and shoots Sawyer, much to Emily's fury. Emily runs outside and waves off the incoming fighter planes with a presidential flag, calling off the air strike. Sawyer survives thanks to a pocket watch once belonging to Abraham Lincoln that stopped Walker's bullet.

With Finnerty's help, Cale realizes that Raphelson was the one who gave Walker the launch codes, having acted at the behest of the corrupt military–industrial complex. Believing Sawyer dead and that Cale will never be believed, Raphelson is tricked into confessing and arrested for treason when Sawyer appears and thus removing Raphelson from the position of President. Sawyer names Cale his new special agent and takes him and Emily on an aerial tour of D.C. on Marine One, aboard which he receives word that France, Iran, Israel and Russia have agreed to his peace deal after learning of the events at the White House, calling for an end to all wars.

Cast

 Channing Tatum as John Cale, an Afghanistan veteran and Capitol policeman who gets his daughter tickets to a special White House tour but they get trapped in the middle of an attack.
 Jamie Foxx as James Sawyer, President of the United States, who is the main target of an attack on the White House.
 Maggie Gyllenhaal as Carol Wilkes Finnerty, Secret Service Presidential Detail Deputy Special Agent-in-Charge.
 Jason Clarke as Emil Stenz, an ex-Delta Force and CIA operative who leads a group of mercenaries in infiltrating and taking over the White House.
 Richard Jenkins as Eli Raphelson, a corrupt Speaker of the United States House of Representatives, who briefly assumes the Presidency after Sawyer is predicted dead and after his Vice President dies during an attack on Air Force One.
 Joey King as Emily Cale, the daughter of John Cale.
 James Woods as Martin Walker, a rogue Secret Service Presidential Detail Special Agent-in-Charge, and the leader of the attack on the White House.
 Nicolas Wright as Donnie Donaldson, White House Tour Guide.
 Jimmi Simpson as Skip Tyler, an ex-NSA cyber-security analyst turned hacker and the technical specialist in Stenz's group.
 Michael Murphy as Alvin Hammond, Vice President of the United States who briefly assumes the Presidency after Sawyer is claimed dead. He is later killed after Air Force One is attacked.
 Rachelle Lefevre as Melanie Schopp-Cale, John's former wife and Emily's mother.
 Lance Reddick as General Caulfield, Vice Chairman of the Joint Chiefs of Staff.
 Matt Craven as Kellerman, Capitol Police officer.
 Jake Weber as Ted Hope, Secret Service agent.
 Peter Jacobson as Wallace, Chief of Staff to the Vice President.
 Garcelle Beauvais as Alison Sawyer, First Lady of the United States.
 Kevin Rankin as Carl Killick, a sociopathic white nationalist and one of Stenz's henchmen.
 Barbara Williams as Muriel Walker, Martin Walker's wife.
 Falk Hentschel as Motts, Stenz's German petty sidekick.
 Jackie Geary as Jenna Bydwell, Hammond's aid and Cale's trusted confident.
 Andrew Simms as Roger Skinner, a sleazy reporter and right-wing political commentator who criticizes Sawyer on his show. 
 Vincent Leclerc as Ryan Todd, Secret Service agent.
 Anthony Lemke as Captain Paul Hutton,
 Kyle Gatehouse as Conrad Cern, Killick's associate, who bombs the Capitol rotunda as a diversion for the mercenaries.
 Patrick Sabongui as Bobby, Stenz's best friend for ten years.

Production
White House Down is directed by Roland Emmerich and written by James Vanderbilt, who is also one of the film's producers. The journal said the script was similar "tonally and thematically" to the films Die Hard (1988) and Air Force One (1997). In the following April, Sony hired Roland Emmerich as director. Emmerich began filming in July 2012 at the La Cité Du Cinéma in Montreal, Quebec, Canada. Cinematographer Anna Foerster shot the film with Arri Alexa Plus digital cameras.

In 2012, Sony competed with Millennium Films, who were producing Olympus Has Fallen (also about a takeover of the White House) to complete casting and to begin filming.

Release
White House Down was originally scheduled for a November 1, 2013 release, but was moved up to a June 28, 2013 release. The film was released on DVD and Blu-ray on November 5, 2013.

Reception

Critical response
On review aggregator Rotten Tomatoes the film holds an approval rating of 52% based on 203 reviews, with an average rating of 5.4/10. The website's critical consensus reads: "White House Down benefits from the leads' chemistry, but director Roland Emmerich smothers the film with narrative clichés and choppily edited action." At Metacritic the film has a weighted average score of 52 out of 100, based on 43 critics, indicating "mixed or average reviews". Audiences polled by CinemaScore gave the film an average grade of "A−" on an A+ to F scale.

Roth Cornet of IGN gave the film a score of 6.5/10, concluding: "White House Down is a pretty silly rehashing of previously tread action movie territory, but if you're willing to laugh along with (or even at) it, it can be a highly entertaining experience." Andrew Chan of the Film Critics Circle of Australia wrote, "I am not entirely sure, whether I should be happy or sad that I laughed when someone got shot or bombed, but such is the manner of how the film is played out." Mark Kermode of The Observer gave the film 3/5 stars, writing that it "at least has the good grace to laugh at itself as it rolls out the dingbat-daft action-movie cliches." Shubhra Gupta of The Indian Express gave the film 2.5/5 stars, writing: "Trouble is, it goes on too long. It has several climactic moments, but every time you ready for the exit, the film bounces back again for the next round." Peter Bradshaw of The Guardian gave the film 2/5 stars, saying that "real thrills – dependent on real, believable jeopardy – are not on offer: just cheerfully absurd spectacle and a little bit of humour."

Box office
White House Down grossed $73.1 million in the United States, and $132.3 million internationally, for a total gross of $205.4 million, against a budget of $150 million.

The film made $24.8 million in North America during its opening weekend, coming in below expectations and finishing fourth at the box office.

References

External links

 
 
 

2013 films
2013 action thriller films
2010s buddy films
American films about revenge
American action thriller films
American buddy action films
American political thriller films
Centropolis Entertainment films
Columbia Pictures films
Films about Delta Force
Films about the Central Intelligence Agency
Films about United States Army Special Forces
Films about fictional presidents of the United States
Films about terrorism in the United States
Films about the United States Secret Service
Films about World War III
Films directed by Roland Emmerich
Films produced by James Vanderbilt
Films scored by Harald Kloser
Films set in 2014
Films set in the White House
Films set in Iran
Films set in Israel
Films set in France
Films set in China
Films set in Russia
Films shot in Montreal
Films with screenplays by James Vanderbilt
IMAX films
United States presidential succession in fiction
Films about coups d'état
Films about nuclear war and weapons
2010s English-language films
2010s American films